José Bento Azevedo Carvalho (born 19 September 1973) is a Portuguese retired road racing cyclist, and most recently, general manager of UCI WorldTeam .

Career
Born in Vila do Conde, Azevedo's principal career successes were fifth overall at the 2001 Giro d'Italia, sixth overall at the 2002 Tour de France and fifth overall at the 2004 Tour de France. He also made a second place in the Germany Tour, just behind Michael Rogers. He won the queen-stage of the German competition.

Until 2005 he was a renowned domestique; his primary role was to serve as Lance Armstrong's lieutenant in mountain stages, specifically stages in the Pyrenees Mountains. Lance Armstrong described him as the best lieutenant he has ever had. Nicknamed "The Ace", he moved to US Postal (which became the now-defunct Discovery Channel Pro Cycling Team) from Team ONCE (also defunct) in 2004.

In 2006 Azevedo wore the #1 background during the Tour de France and he claimed the highest finish in the general classification amongst his Discovery Channel teammates.  Azevedo finished 18th overall, 37 minutes and 11 seconds behind race winner Óscar Pereiro, following the disqualification of apparent winner Floyd Landis.

To be able to spend more time with his family, Azevedo opted for a home team. He became the leader of the Benfica cycling team and aimed to win the Tour of Portugal. Azevedo finished his career at the end of the Tour of Portugal 2008.

In 2013 he was the Directeur Sportif for Chris Horner when he won the Vuelta.

Career achievements

Major results

1994
 6th Overall Volta ao Algarve
1995
 1st Prologue Grande Prémio Jornal de Notícias
 4th Overall Volta ao Algarve
 8th Overall Volta a Portugal
1996
 1st  Time trial, National Road Championships
 1st Overall Grande Prémio Internacional Costa Azul
 5th Overall Volta a Portugal
1997
 1st  Time trial, National Road Championships
 1st Stage 11 (ITT) Volta a Portugal
 6th Overall Volta ao Alentejo
1998
 1st Overall Troféu Joaquim Agostinho
1st Stages 3 & 5
 1st Stage 5 (ITT) Volta a Portugal
 4th Overall Volta ao Algarve
 7th Overall Volta ao Alentejo
1999
 1st Stage 4 Troféu Joaquim Agostinho
 3rd Time trial, National Road Championships
 4th Overall Grande Prémio Jornal de Notícias
 5th Overall Volta ao Alentejo
 8th Overall Volta a Portugal
 9th Subida al Naranco
 10th Overall Volta ao Algarve
2000
 1st Overall G.P. Portugal Telecom
 1st Prologue GP Sport Noticias
 2nd Overall Volta ao Algarve
1st Stage 5
 2nd Overall Grande Prémio Jornal de Notícias
 4th Overall Volta a Portugal
 4th Overall Vuelta a Asturias
1st Stage 4
2001
 1st  Time trial, National Road Championships
 2nd Overall Volta ao Algarve
1st Stage 3
 5th Overall Paris–Nice
 5th Overall Giro d'Italia
 8th Overall Tour of the Basque Country
2002
 1st Stage 1 (TTT) Vuelta a España
 3rd Overall Euskal Bizikleta
 3rd Overall Grand Prix du Midi Libre
 5th La Flèche Wallonne
 6th Overall Tour de France
 8th Klasika Primavera
2003
 2nd Overall Deutschland Tour
1st Stage 5
2004
 1st Stage 4 (TTT) Tour de France
 5th Overall Tour de France
 10th Overall Paris–Nice
2005
 1st Stage 4 (TTT) Tour de France
 10th Overall Tour de Georgia
2006
 4th Overall Critérium du Dauphiné Libéré
 5th Overall Vuelta a Castilla y León
 6th Overall Paris–Nice
 10th Overall Tour of the Basque Country
2007
 1st Stage 4 GP CTT Correios de Portugal
 2nd Time trial, National Road Championships
 6th Overall Tour de Luxembourg
 6th Overall Volta a Portugal
2008
 6th Overall GP CTT Correios de Portugal
 9th Overall Vuelta a Asturias

Grand Tour general classification results timeline

References

External links

1973 births
Living people
People from Vila do Conde
Portuguese male cyclists
Cyclists at the 1996 Summer Olympics
Cyclists at the 2000 Summer Olympics
Olympic cyclists of Portugal
S.L. Benfica (cycling)
Sportspeople from Porto District